Dolný Bar is a village and municipality in the Dunajská Streda District in the Trnava Region of south-west Slovakia.

Geography
The municipality lies at an altitude of 114 metres and covers an area of 8.200 km². It has a population of about 560 people.

History
In the 9th century, the territory of Dolný Bar became part of the Kingdom of Hungary.
In historical records the village was first mentioned in 1245.
After the Austro-Hungarian army disintegrated in November 1918, Czechoslovak troops occupied the area, later acknowledged internationally by the Treaty of Trianon. Between 1938 and 1945 Dolný Bar once more became part of Miklós Horthy's Hungary through the First Vienna Award. From 1945 until the Velvet Divorce, it was part of Czechoslovakia. Since then it has been part of Slovakia.

See also
 List of municipalities and towns in Slovakia

References

Genealogical resources

The records for genealogical research are available at the state archive "Statny Archiv in Bratislava, Banska Bystrica, Bytca, Kosice, Levoca, Nitra, Presov, Slovakia"
 Roman Catholic church records (births/marriages/deaths): 1673-1895 (parish A)
 Lutheran church records (births/marriages/deaths): 1823-1946 (parish B)
 Reformated church records (births/marriages/deaths): 1784-1902 (parish B)

External links
Surnames of living people in Dolny Bar

Villages and municipalities in Dunajská Streda District
Hungarian communities in Slovakia